Mangal Shobhajatra or Mangal Shovajatra is a mass procession that takes place at dawn on the first day of the Bengali New Year in Bangladesh. The procession is organised by the teachers and students of the Faculty of Fine Arts of the University of Dhaka. The festival is considered an expression of the secular identity of the Bangladeshi people and as a way to promote unity. It was declared an intangible cultural heritage by UNESCO in 2016, categorised on the representative list as a heritage of humanity.

Etymology 
The Bengali phrase Mangal Shobhajatra literally means "procession for well-being".

History  

The procession of the festival was first observed in 1989, when the autocratic ruler Hussain Muhammad Ershad was the president of the country. He became the president of the country through a bloodless coup d'état.

At that time, the country was under a military dictatorship and was suffering from floods. A mass uprising took place in Dhaka during which many people, including Noor Hossain, died. The students of the Dhaka University Faculty of Fine Arts decided to demonstrate against the regime by arranging the Mangal Shobhajatra on Pahela Baishakh.

About 
Every year, thousands of people take part in the procession that features gigantic replicas of birds, fish, animals, folk tale and other motifs. The rally symbolizes unity, peace, and the driving away of evil to allow progress of country and humanity. It is considered as an expression of the secular identity of the Bangali people, uniting the country irrespective of class, age, religious faith, or gender.

UNESCO recognition 
In 2014 the Bangla Academy compiled a nomination file that was approved by the Ministry of Cultural Affairs of Bangladesh and submitted to UNESCO. On 30 November 2016 the Mangal Shobhajatra festival was selected as an intangible cultural heritage by the Inter-governmental Committee on Safeguarding Intangible Cultural Heritage of UNESCO at its 11thsession, which was held in Addis Ababa, Ethiopia.

Celebrations in India
In 2017, following the footsteps of Bangladesh, the festive Mangal Shobhajatra was brought out in West Bengal.

References

External links

 

Annual events in Bangladesh
Culture in Dhaka
Events in Bangladesh
Masterpieces of the Oral and Intangible Heritage of Humanity
April observances
University of Dhaka